Bruno Rafael Rodrigues do Nascimento (born 7 March 1997), known as Bruno Rodrigues, is a Brazilian professional footballer who plays as a forward for Cruzeiro, on loan from Tombense.

Club career
Born in Ceará-Mirim, Rodrigues joined the youth setup of Atlético Paranaense in 2014. In the 2015 edition of the Brazil U20 Cup, he emerged as the joint top-scorer with three goals. On 29 January 2017, Rodrigues made his first team and Campeonato Paranaense debut in a 1–1 draw against Rio Branco Sport Club, where he contributed with one assist.

On 2 March 2017, Rodrigues joined Joinville on a three month long loan deal. His loan deal was extended till the end of the year in April. After having contributed with two goals, he was recalled from Joinville by his parent club on 29 September 2017.

On 1 January 2018, Rodrigues was loaned to Cypriot club Doxa Katokopia for six months.

After his contract with Athletico Paranaense was terminated, Rodrigues signed with Tombense in December 2019 and was immediately loaned out to Ponte Preta for the 2020 season.

Club statistics

Honours
São Paulo
Campeonato Paulista: 2021

Cruzeiro
 Campeonato Brasileiro - Série B: 2022

References

External links

1997 births
Living people
Brazilian footballers
Association football forwards
Campeonato Brasileiro Série A players
Campeonato Brasileiro Série B players
Campeonato Brasileiro Série C players
Cypriot First Division players
Primeira Liga players
Club Athletico Paranaense players
Joinville Esporte Clube players
Paraná Clube players
Doxa Katokopias FC players
Tombense Futebol Clube players
Associação Atlética Ponte Preta players
Cruzeiro Esporte Clube players
F.C. Famalicão players
Brazilian expatriate footballers
Brazilian expatriate sportspeople in Cyprus
Expatriate footballers in Cyprus
Brazilian expatriate sportspeople in Portugal
Expatriate footballers in Portugal